The Gibraltar Road–Waterway Canal Bridge is a bridge located on Gibraltar Road over the Waterway Canal in Gibraltar, Michigan.  It was listed on the National Register of Historic Places in 2000.

History
The Wayne County Road Commission paved a section of Gibraltar Road in the early 1930s, and constructed a number of new bridges, including this one, during the project.

Description

A concrete balustrade with urn-shaped spindles flanks the roadway.

The bridge itself is of a rare cantilevered concrete arch design. The traditional arch bridge design requires a complete arch; in contrast, the cantilevered arch design is divided into two structurally independent half-arches which are each cantilevered from one side.  A slab is suspended between the two cantilevered sections; in the Gibraltar Road Bridge, this section is 9 feet long.  Close inspection of side walls of the bridge reveals two seams marking the end of the cantilevered arms.

After construction, the Wayne County Road Commissioners noted that "this low sweeping arch bridge is in keeping with its surroundings and is one of the features which make Gibraltar Road so attractive."

See also

References

External links

Middle Gibraltar Road Bridge from HistoricBridges.org: Multiple photographs of the bridge

Road bridges on the National Register of Historic Places in Michigan
Bridges completed in 1932
Bridges in Wayne County, Michigan
National Register of Historic Places in Wayne County, Michigan
Concrete bridges in the United States
Arch bridges in the United States
Cantilever bridges in the United States